Rafael Angel Novoa (born October 26, 1967) is an American former Major League Baseball pitcher who played for the San Francisco Giants in 1990 and for the Milwaukee Brewers in 1993.

Biography
A native of New York, New York, Novoa attended Fordham Preparatory School and played college baseball for Villanova, where he earned All-Tournament honors in the 1987 Big East Conference baseball tournament. In 1987 and 1988, he played collegiate summer baseball with the Harwich Mariners of the Cape Cod Baseball League.

He was drafted by the Giants in the 9th round of the 1989 amateur draft. Novoa played his first professional season with the Class A (Short Season) Everett Giants in 1989, and his last season in the California Angels' farm system in 1996.

Novoa never won a game at the major league level but on September 30, 1990, he was able to notch his one and only career save. He pitched the final four innings of a 8–2 Giants win over the arch rival Dodgers. He saved the game for starting pitcher Rick Reuschel. Ironically, this was the 214th and final victory of Reuschel's career.

References

External links
"Rafael Novoa Statistics". The Baseball Cube. 10 January 2008.
"Rafael Novoa Statistics". Baseball-Reference. 10 January 2008.

1967 births
Living people
Villanova Wildcats baseball players
Harwich Mariners players
San Francisco Giants players
Milwaukee Brewers players
Major League Baseball pitchers
Nashville Sounds players
Chico Heat players
American expatriate baseball players in Canada
Binghamton Mets players
Clinton Giants players
El Paso Diablos players
Everett Giants players
Iowa Cubs players
Lake Elsinore Storm players
Midland Angels players
New Orleans Zephyrs players
Phoenix Firebirds players
Shreveport Captains players
Vancouver Canadians players
Baseball players from New York City
Fordham Preparatory School alumni